Jagbir Dahiya is an Indian film director and producer. He directed and produced Kuch Kariye starring Sukhwinder Singh, Shirya Saran and directed The Journey of Karma starring Shakti Kapoor and Poonam Pandey. Recently he started his music label  Asian Records.

Filmography

References 

Living people
Indian film directors
Year of birth missing (living people)